This is a list of the individuals who were, at any given time, considered the next in line to inherit the throne of Spain, should the incumbent monarch die. Those who actually succeeded (at any future time) are shown in bold.

From the personal union of the Crown of Castile and the Crown of Aragon until the accession of the first Bourbon monarch in 1700, the heir to the Spanish throne was the person closest to the Spanish monarch according to the male-preference cognatic primogeniture. From the accession of Philip V until the Pragmatic Sanction of 1830, the heir to the Spanish throne was the person closest to the Spanish monarch according to the Salic law. The heir, whether heir apparent or heir presumptive, was often granted the title of Prince of Asturias.

Significant breaks in the succession, where the designated heir did not in fact succeed (due to usurpation, conquest, revolution, or lack of heirs) are shown as breaks in the table below.

The symbols +1, +2, etc. are to be read "once (twice, etc.) removed in descendancy", i.e., the child or grandchild  (etc.) of a cousin of the degree specified.  The symbols -1, -2, etc. indicate the converse relationship, i.e., the cousin of a parent or grandparent (etc.).

1516 to 1700

1700 to 1808

1808 to 1813

1813 to 1868

1870 to 1873

1874 to 1931

Since 1947

See also 

Line of succession to the Spanish throne

References 

Heirs

Spain
Lists of Spanish nobility
Spain